Whistler may refer to:
 Someone who whistles

Places

Canada
 Whistler, British Columbia, a resort town
 Whistler railway station
 Whistler Secondary School
 Whistler Blackcomb, a ski resort in British Columbia
 Whistler Mountain, British Columbia
 The Whistlers (Alberta), a mountain in Alberta

United States
 Whistler, Alabama, an unincorporated town until the 1950s, when it was annexed into neighboring Prichard
 Whistler Geyser, Yellowstone National Park, Wyoming
 Whistler Mountain (Washington), a mountain summit in Washington state
 Whistler Range, Nevada, a mountain range

Elsewhere
 Whistler Nunatak, Palmer Land, Antarctica
 Whistler River, New Zealand

People with the surname
 Alwyne Michael Webster Whistler (1909–1993), British Army general 
 Anna McNeill Whistler (1804–1881), James Abbott McNeill Whistler's mother
 Arthur Whistler (1944–2020), American ethnobotanist
 Catherine Whistler is a British art historian and curator
 Charles Whistler (1856–1913), British writer
 George Washington Whistler (1800–1849), American civil engineer and railroad builder
 Hugh Whistler (1889–1943), English police officer and ornithologist
 James Abbott McNeill Whistler (1834–1903), American-born British painter, famous for Whistler's Mother
 General Sir Lashmer Whistler (1898–1963), soldier
 Laurence Whistler (1912–2000), British glass engraver and poet
 Rex Whistler (1905–1944), British painter
 William McNeill Whistler (1836–1900), physician, brother of James Abbott McNeill Whistler

People with the middle name
 Kenneth Whistler Street, (1890–1972), Australian Chief Justice, son of Philip Whistler Street
  Laurence Whistler Street, (1926–2018), Australian Chief Justice, son of Kenneth Whistler Street
 Philip Whistler Street (1863–1938), Australian Chief Justice

Animals
 Whistler (bird), a group of passerine birds in the family Pachycephalidae
 Goldeneye (bird), a Northern Hemisphere seaduck in the genus Bucephala
 Groundhog, American species of marmot
 Hoary marmot, American species of marmot

Arts, entertainment, and media

Fictional characters
 Whistler (Buffyverse), a character in the television series Buffy the Vampire Slayer
 Abraham Whistler, mentor to the Marvel Comics character Blade in film and animated continuity
 Coach Whistler, a mascot of The Land of Play in Pajanimals
 Erwin "Whistler" Emory, a character in the film Sneakers
 James Whistler (Prison Break character), mysterious inmate in the television series Prison Breaks third season

Music
 Whistler (band), a UK indie band
 "The Whistler" (song), a 1977 single by the British rock group Jethro Tull
 "The Whistler", Fourplay's instrumental song on its 2008 album Energy

Television
 Whistler (TV series), set in Whistler, British Columbia
 The Whistler (TV series), television show of the 1950s

Other uses in arts, entertainment, and media
 CKEE-FM, identified on air and in print as "101.5 Whistler FM", a radio station in Whistler, British Columbia
 The Whistler (novel), a 2016 novel by John Grisham
 The Whistler (radio series), a mystery drama radio show and film noir series
 The Whistler (1944 film), the first of eight films in the series

Other uses
 Whistler (radio), a very low frequency radio phenomenon caused by lightning
 Whistler, the development codename for the Microsoft Windows XP computer operating system
 Whistler Group, a company specializing in electronics and automotive laser/radar detection systems
 , a United States Navy patrol vessel in commission from 1917 to 1919

See also
 Whisler (disambiguation)